Tim David Kelly is an American musician, songwriter, record producer, graphic designer & composer for TV/film. He is the singer, guitarist and songwriter for the alternative rock band Kicking Harold whose still popular song "Gasoline" from Space Age Breakdown was featured as the main theme for 8 seasons (72 episodes)on TLC's automobile make-over show, Overhaulin'. Kelly has written many songs for others, including co-writing "Money For That" for the band Shiny Toy Guns. He has produced several albums, including co-producing Lightning Strikes Again by Dokken. Kelly has composed main themes and music cues used in television and film including Gene Simmons Family Jewels (A&E) &
Little Steven's Underground Garage. Kicking Harold released their 5th album, "Red Light District" in 2015 and completed a 25 date American tour as direct support for "The Winery Dogs". In 2017 Kelly opened a new music production studio in Burbank, CA and is currently working again with other artist as well as his own projects.

Discography 

Albums with Kicking Harold
Red Light District (Ultradose) (2015) – Vocals, Guitars, Bass, Drums, producer, Mixer, songwriter
Zombies, Cars & Evil Guitars (Mityma) (2010) – Vocals, Guitars, Bass, Drums, producer, Mixer, songwriter
Space Age Breakdown (Re-Release) (Mityma) (2006) – Vocals, Guitars, producer, Mixer, songwriter
Space Age Breakdown (Mityma) (2002) – Vocals, Guitars, producer, Mixer, songwriter
Return of the Bulb Men (Headliner) (1997) – Vocals, Guitars, Bass, songwriter
Ugly & Festering (Re-Release) (MCA) (1996) – Vocals, Guitars, songwriter
Ugly & Festering (Headliner) (1995) – Vocals, Guitars, songwriter
EP (Self released demo) (1994) – Vocals, Guitars, songwriter

Albums as Tim David Kelly
'"Burn One Down" EP (Headliner) (1997) – Vocals, Guitars, Bass, Songwriter
'"Growing Up Naked'" (Fuzztone) (2001) – Vocals, Guitars, Bass, Producer, Mixer, Songwriter

Albums with Zombie Oil
"Waiting For The Sun" (Ultradose Music) (2013) – Vocalist, Bassist, Producer, Songwriter

Albums with The Bloodshot Gamblers
"Pain & Other Simple Pleasures" (Demon Deluxe) (2011) – Vocals, Guitars, Drums, Producer, Mixer, Songwriter

Albums with Marshal Gold*
"Alchemy" (Ultradose Music) (2020) – Vocals, Guitars, Drums, Producer, Mixer, Songwriter

Album credits 

SHINY TOY GUNS, "Season Of Poison" (Motown/Universal) – Songwriter 
DOKKEN, "Lightning Strikes Again" (Rhino) – Recording Engineer, Co-Producer
DOKKEN, "Broken Bones" (Frontiers) – Recording Engineer  
THE SKIES OF AMERICA, "Shine" (National Recorder) – Bass on US Tour 
DINA D'ALESSANDRO, "Is It Safe" (Worker Ants Music) – Producer, Mixer
THE WYATTS "The Wyatts" (Self Release) – Producer, Mixer, Drums, Guitars
ESCAPING ZANE, "In Wants Out " (Self Release) – Producer, Mixer, Bass, Guitars
THE SOUL MITES, "Faith Healer " (Self-Release) – Mixer
JOHN DIGRAZIA, "John Digrazia" (JDMP) – Producer, Mixer,
VYLAN, "Ultra Suede" (Crash) – Guitars, Bass, Drums, Producer, Mixer, Songwriter
NEVERSHINE, "Hyposonicvelocity" (DK) – Producer, Mixer
ZANE, "Multiple Personality Disorder" (Grestone) – Bass

TV/Film Credits 

"OVERHAULIN" (TLC), Main title theme song – Songwriter, Producer, Guitarist, Vocals
"HERE COMES THE BOOM" (SONY), Music featured in TV ad campaign – Composer
"GENE SIMMON'S FAMILY JEWELS" (A&E), Music featured in series – Co-Composer
"LITTLE STEVEN'S UNDERGROUND GARAGE " (MTV), Main title theme song – Songwriter, Producer, Artist
"PLAYMANIA / QUIZNATION " (GSN), Main title theme song – Co-Songwriter, Co-Producer
"SHREK 2" (DreamWorks), Song used in video game trailer/ad – Songwriter, Producer, Guitarist, Vocals
"TONIGHT SHOW " (NBC), Music featured in series – Songwriter, Producer, Guitarist, Vocals
"ANIMATION SHOW 4 " (Mike Judge), Music featured in film opener – Composer
"ONE BAD TRIP" (MTV), Music featured in series – Songwriter, Producer, Guitarist, Vocals
"PIMP MY RIDE" (MTV), Song featured in series- Songwriter, Producer, Guitarist, Vocals
"MODERN MARVELS" (History), Music featured in series – Co-Composer, Co-Producer
"MARIGOLD" (Paul Bickel Films), End credit song – Songwriter, Producer, Guitarist, Vocals
"I'VE GOT A TATTOO", Music for Del Taco TV ad campaign – Composer, Co-Producer, Artist
"FUNNIEST PETS & PEOPLE " (Super Station), Music featured in series – Co-Composer, Co-Producer
"MOST HIGH" (2nd Act Films), Music featured in film – Songwriter, Producer, Guitarist, Vocals

References

Review of Growing Up Naked from PopMatters

External links 

American rock singers
American male singers
Living people
Year of birth missing (living people)